The spotted towhee (Pipilo maculatus) is a large New World sparrow. The taxonomy of the towhees has been debated in recent decades, and until 1995 this bird and the eastern towhee were considered a single species, the rufous-sided towhee.  Another outdated name for the spotted towhee is the Oregon towhee (Pipilo maculatus oregonus). The call may be harsher and more varied than for the eastern towhee.

Individuals in the Socorro Island population are much smaller than other spotted towhees, and show distinctive gray upper-parts. That population is sometimes treated as a subspecies: the Socorro towhee (Pipilo socorroensis).

Description
 The spotted towhee is a large New World sparrow, roughly the same size as a robin. It has a long, dark, fan-shaped tail with white corners on the end. It has a round body (similar to New World sparrows) with bright red eyes and dull pink legs. It has a wingspan of 11.0 in (28 cm).

Adult males have a generally darker head, upper body and tail with a white belly, rufous sides, white spots on their back and white wing bars. Females look similar but are dark brown and grey instead of black. The spotted towhee has white spots on its primary and secondary feathers; the Eastern towhee is the same bird in terms of its size and structure but does not have white spots.

Distribution and habitat
The spotted towhee lives in dry upland forests, open forests, brushy fields, and chaparrals. It breeds across north-western North America and is present year-round in California, Nevada, Arizona, Utah, Oregon, Washington, Idaho and southern British Columbia. It is not found in arid climates and as a result does not reside in the Sonoran Desert, but resides in northern Arizona and the entirety of California except the southeast corner that borders Arizona. It has also been known to expand as far eastward as western Iowa and southwestern Minnesota. It also occurs in fringe wetland forests and riparian forests near the border of upland forests. Because the spotted towhee's habitat overlaps with areas of the United States that experience regular forest fires (Arizona, New Mexico, California), it tends to be found in unburned chaparral and avoids chaparral and forests which have been burned due to lack of ground cover and minimal foraging ability. Spotted towhees will be present in an area that is recovering after a burn (less than 15 years old), due to excellent ground cover and ease of ground foraging from the recovering understory vegetation, although populations will decrease after a forest fire until the vegetation has grown back.

Its breeding habitat in the southwest is largely dependent on coastal sage scrub, as it provides cover from predators. It migrates to northern and northwestern United States and southwestern Canada to breed in scrubland, parks and suburban gardens. Northwestern birds migrate eastwards to the central plains of the United States, mostly the northwestern-central Great Plains. In other areas, some birds may move to lower elevations in the winter. Their breeding habitat is chaparral, thickets or shrubby areas across western North America. This bird interbreeds with the collared towhee where their ranges overlap in southwestern Mexico.

Behavior

Breeding and nesting
The location for the nests is usually found in exposed areas, but conceal the nest as it is being built. The female builds the nest over a period of about five days. It is bulky and sturdily made of leaves, strips of bark, twigs, forb stalks, and grasses, lined with pine needles, shredded bark, grass, and sometimes hair.

At least two broods, consisting of three to five eggs, are laid per season. The egg shells are grayish or creamy-white, sometimes with a tinge of green, with reddish brown spots that can form a wreath or cap. The female incubates the eggs alone for 12 to 14 days; the young leave the nest at 10 to 12 days. Nests are parasitized by cowbirds.

Diet
These birds forage on the ground or in low vegetation, with a habit of noisily rummaging through dry leaves searching for food. During the breeding season (spring and summer) they mainly eat insects, ground dwelling beetles, spiders and other arthropods that reside in the leaf litter that is foraged by the spotted towhee. They only eat protein rich food in the breeding season, and in the fall and winter they focus on foraging for acorns, seeds oats and berries. They will frequent bird feeders if present in their woodland habitat.

Threats
Their main predators in less developed areas are ground dwelling snakes because nests are built on the ground. There is a strong relationship between the number of snakes that a nest encounters and the lowered probability of young chicks fledgling. In developed areas and habitat near urban development their main predators are household cats.

References

External links

Spotted towhee species account - Cornell Lab of Ornithology
Spotted towhee - Pipilo maculatus - USGS Patuxent Bird Identification InfoCenter
 
 
 

spotted towhee
Native birds of Western Canada
Native birds of the Western United States
Fauna of the California chaparral and woodlands
Birds of Mexico
Birds of the Sierra Madre Occidental
Birds of the Sierra Madre Oriental
Birds of the Trans-Mexican Volcanic Belt
Birds of Guatemala
spotted towhee